FC Systema-KKhP Cherniakhiv was a Ukrainian football club from Cherniakhiv, Zhytomyr Oblast.

League and cup history

{|class="wikitable"
|-bgcolor="#efefef"
! Season
! Div.
! Pos.
! Pl.
! W
! D
! L
! GS
! GA
! P
!Domestic Cup
!colspan=2|Europe
!Notes
|}

Systema-KKhP Cherniakhiv, FC
Football clubs in Zhytomyr Oblast
Association football clubs established in 1995
Association football clubs disestablished in 2003
1995 establishments in Ukraine
2003 disestablishments in Ukraine